The 2022 New Mexico Secretary of State election was held on November 8, 2022, to elect the Secretary of State of New Mexico. Incumbent Democratic secretary Maggie Toulouse Oliver won re-election to a second term. She was elected to a full term with 57.8% of the vote in 2018.

Democratic primary

Candidates

Declared
Maggie Toulouse Oliver, incumbent secretary of state

Results

Republican primary
Audrey Trujillo, a small business owner, was the sole Republican candidate to file. Her candidacy has been endorsed by the America First Secretary of State Coalition. Trujillo has called for a statewide audit of the 2020 presidential election.

Candidates

Declared
Audrey Trujillo, small business owner and candidate for New Mexico House of Representatives in 2020

Did not file
Tracy Tatro Trujillo, rancher

Results

Libertarian primary

Candidates

Declared
Mayna Erika Myers

Results

General election

Predictions

Polling

Results

Notes

References

External links
Official campaign sites
Maggie Toulouse Oliver (D) for Secretary of State
Audrey Trujillo (R) for Secretary of State

Secretary of State
New Mexico